Sivakoti is a village in Razole Mandal, Dr. B.R. Ambedkar Konaseema district in the state of Andhra Pradesh in India.

Geography 

Demographics 
 India census, Sivakodu had a population of 7961, out of which 4002 were male and 3959 were female. The population of children below 6 years of age was 9%. The literacy rate of the village was 82%.

References 

Villages in Razole mandal